The following lists events that happened during 2015 in the Republic of Austria.

Incumbents
 President: Heinz Fischer
 Chancellor: Werner Faymann

Governors
 Burgenland: Hans Niessl 
 Carinthia: Peter Kaiser
 Lower Austria: Erwin Pröll 
 Salzburg: Wilfried Haslauer Jr.
 Styria: Franz Voves (until 16 June); Hermann Schützenhöfer (from 16 June)
 Tyrol: Günther Platter
 Upper Austria: Josef Pühringer
 Vienna: Michael Häupl 
 Vorarlberg: Markus Wallner

Events

January
 January 5 - An avalanche near the Rettenbach glacier in the Austrian Alps, kills two prospects for the United States ski team, Ronnie Berlack and Bryce Astle.

February 
 February 25 - The Austrian Parliament passes a bill, partly aimed at tackling Islamist radicalism, that gives Muslims more legal security but bans foreign funding for mosques and imams.

May

 May 19 - Austria held the 60th Eurovision Song Contest in Vienna between 19 and 23 May.
Sweden won.

August
August 27 - Burgenland corpses discovery: the bodies of 71 illegal immigrants were discovered in a lorry on the Ost Autobahn in Burgenland

November 
 Samra Kesinovic, an Austrian teenager who traveled to Syria to join the Islamic State of Iraq and the Levant, is reported dead, having been beaten to death by the group after trying to escape from Raqqa. Her companion, Sabina Selimovic, was reported to have been killed in fighting in Syria in September 2014.

December 
 December 2 - Vienna swimming pool rape
 December 5 - Miss Earth 2015 took place on December 5, 2015, at Marx Halle, Vienna, Austria. Jamie Herrell of the Philippines will crown her successor at the end of the event.

Deaths
 June 22 - Irma Schwager, Second World War resistance fighter and communist politician (b. 1920)

References

 
2010s in Austria
Years of the 21st century in Austria
Austria
Austria